Suphap Phongthong  (born ) is a retired Thai female volleyball player, who played as a middle blocker. 

She was part of the Thailand women's national volleyball team at the 2002 FIVB Volleyball Women's World Championship in Germany. On club level she played with Pepsi Bangkok.

Clubs
 Pepsi Bangkok (2002)

References

1982 births
Living people
Suphap Phongthong
Place of birth missing (living people)
Volleyball players at the 2002 Asian Games
Suphap Phongthong
Suphap Phongthong
Suphap Phongthong